Jay Seth Ruderman (born March 16, 1966) is an American lawyer, disability rights activist and philanthropist. He is the president of the Ruderman Family Foundation.

Early life and education
Jay Ruderman was born in Boston to Marcia and Morton E. Ruderman, the eldest of three children. Ruderman's father was a founder of Meditech. Ruderman attended public schools in Lynnfield, Massachusetts, and received his undergraduate degree in 1988 from Brandeis University, where he served as president of the student body in 1986–1987. He earned his JD from Boston University School of Law in 1993.

Legal and philanthropic career
Ruderman began his career as Assistant District Attorney in Salem, MA and also worked as deputy director of AIPAC  before enlisting in the Israeli Defense Forces. He then went back to AIPAC as Leadership Director in Israel before assuming a position at the Ruderman Family Foundation.

In addition, Ruderman served on the board of directors of the National Organization on Disability. He sits on the board of governors of the University of Haifa, the Jewish Agency for Israel  and the American Jewish Joint Distribution Committee, and is a member of Brandeis University Board of Trustees.

Ruderman says the Ruderman Foundation's first major investment was in Jewish day schools, to ensure the inclusion of children with disabilities.

Disability rights activism
In November 2015, Ruderman criticized Donald Trump for mocking the disability of New York Times writer Serge Kovaleski, who has a congenital condition that affects joint movement.
 
Ruderman released two white papers focusing on television content and people with disabilities, as well as a white paper on first responders and suicide. In 2019 Jay Ruderman enacted a scholarship for students with disabilities at Yale School of Drama with the goal of increasing  authentic representation for disabilities in Hollywood. Since then, Ruderman has also focused on increasing authentic representation in the entertainment industry. Despite recent improvements in authentic casting in 2020, Ruderman has emphasized that the low representation on screen had implications in shaping attitudes towards people with disabilities.

Ruderman works with actors, disability activists and celebrities to spread awareness of disability inclusion in the entertainment industry. Some of them serve on the Ruderman Family Foundation's International Advisory Council.

Ruderman partnered with Variety magazine for Variety's 2019 Inclusion Summit, where panelists discussed disability inclusion in entertainment. Ruderman and his wife have also been credited with helping to bring disability inclusion to the Oscars. In 2020, Zack Gottsagen, an actor who has Down syndrome, presented an award with actor Shia LaBeouf.

In February 2019, Ruderman collaborated with a disabled rights group, LINK20, in an appeal to rename Major League Baseball's "disabled list," the 'injured list.' 

In May 2019, Ruderman announced that his foundation would award a Seal of Authentic Representation to  television or feature film projects featuring actors with disabilities in substantial acting roles.

At the 2020 Sundance Film Festival, Ruderman pushed to improve accessibility and the inclusion of people with disabilities and diversity.

In March 2020, Ruderman organized an event in which Peter and Bobby Farrelly were awarded the Morton E. Ruderman Award in Inclusion for hiring actors with disabilities.

In response to the COVID-19 pandemic, Ruderman expressed concern about the effects on the mental health of first responders and healthcare workers. He also announced grants to workers at Massachusetts General Hospital and the Boston Police Foundation to support their mental health.

U.S.-Israel relations 
Ruderman is actively involved in fostering understanding between American Jewry and Israel. He was among several signatories of an ad expressing disappointment over the stance of the Israeli government on egalitarian prayer at the Western Wall. Ruderman was also critical of the comment of Israel's Minister of Education regarding the high rate of intermarriage among American Jews. Ruderman was quoted as saying the "doomsday talks of an irreversible chasm between Israel and the American Jewish community were mistaken," in light of a recent Ruderman Family Foundation survey and in response to the notion that the bond between U.S. Jews and Israel is weakening.

Views and opinions
Ruderman was critical of the movie Don't Worry, He Won't Get Far on Foot for casting Joaquin Phoenix in the role of a disabled man instead of an actor with a disability.

In July 2017, he similarly condemned the movie Blind starring Alec Baldwin and Demi Moore on grounds that Baldwin played a blind character. In his view the movie was "just the latest example of treating disability as a costume." He likened the casting of non-disabled actors to portray characters with disabilities to blackface and states that it's time for society to condemn the practice just like casting white actors to play black characters is no longer socially acceptable. The incident led to written exchanges between the movie's director, Michael Mailer, and Ruderman, both published by the industry publication Deadline.com.

Ruderman also criticized Me Before You for its  portrayal of disability: The protagonistwho is paralyzedends up committing suicide because he feels his life is not worth living. Ruderman stated: "To the millions of people with significant disabilities currently leading fulfilling, rich lives, it posits that they are better off committing suicide." Ruderman's second major point in this controversy was that it is problematic for a non-disabled actor to play a character with a disability, a topic he often speaks up about.

Awards and recognition
In September 2022, Ruderman and his wife were awarded the Lifetime Achievement Award by The Jerusalem Post for their exceptional and long-standing work of promoting the inclusion of people with disabilities, and to strengthening the relationship between Israel and American Jewry.

Ruderman was named by The Jerusalem Post as one of the 50 most influential Jews of the year in 2016 and again in 2022.

In 2021, Ruderman was named one of the top 100 Most Influential Bostonians by Boston (magazine).

 Honorary doctorate from University of Haifa, Israel (2015)
 Honorary doctorate from Brandeis University (2018)
 Jacob Rader Marcus Award from the American Jewish Archives (2019)
 Media Access Awards SAG-AFTRA Disability Awareness Award (2019) 
 Boston Common Magazine, "Power List" (2022)

All About Change 
In October 2018, Jay Ruderman launched his podcast, All About Change. The series is dedicated to featuring each guest's activism and dedication to social justice, with the show's description saying, "All About Change is a podcast focused on inclusion, innovation, and social justice."

To date, the audio series has had 4 seasons and over 50 episodes. Guests have included notable individuals including Lawrence Bacow, Darren Walker, Judy Woodruff, RJ Mitte, Richard Marriott, Cheryl Hines, the Farrelly brothers, Fran Drescher, Christine Simmons, Tony Goldwyn, and Geena Davis.

Published works 
"Ultrawealthy Donors Shouldn't Continue to Call the Shots at Jewish Charities," Chronicle of Philanthropy
"Leveraging Israeli-Americans for the Benefit of the Wider Community," eJewish Philanthropy 
"Stop Enabling Donors Outsized Influence on Jewish Life,"  The Forward
"People with Disabilities are the Forgotten Vulnerable,"  The Hill
"In Jewish Philanthropy, a Case Study of How a Crisis Can Expand Communal Giving," Inside Philanthropy
"The road to full inclusion: How to accommodate people with disabilities more fully, 30 years after the ADA," New York Daily News
"Britney Spears' Freedom Would Be a Victory for Mental Health" TheWrap
"Yemen, Gateway To The Region" Eurasia Review
"With 'CODA's' Oscars, Authentic Representation in Hollywood Takes a Huge Step Forward,"  Variety (magazine)
"Pioneering a transformative model for healthcare leadership" Boston Business Journal
"Want systemic change? An unlikely model for Israelis with disabilities has lessons for us all" EJewishPhilanthropy 
Mental health programs for our first responders must be improved, expanded" Chicago Sun-Times
"Jewish cuisine as a force to connect Israelis and American Jewry" JNS
"Indonesia: With ‘Soft Power’ Comes Great Responsibility" The National Interest
"Working with influencers to help ignite social change" Candid
"How the Oscars Embraced Accessibility and Inclusion With ASL Interpreters and More" Variety Magazine

Personal life
Ruderman is married to Israeli-American Shira Menashe Ruderman, who serves as executive director of the Ruderman Foundation. Ruderman met Shira while living in Israel and attending an ulpan where she was teaching.
Ruderman lives in the Greater Boston area and has four children.

References

External links
 Jay Ruderman's Author Page on the Jerusalem Post
 Jay Ruderman's Author Page on the Times of Israel
 Jay Ruderman's Author Page on Fathom Journal
 Jay Ruderman's Podcast: All Inclusive

1966 births
Living people
Philanthropists from Massachusetts
American disability rights activists
Brandeis University alumni
Boston University School of Law alumni
20th-century American Jews
21st-century American Jews